The Prodigal Wife is a lost 1918 American silent drama film directed by Frank Reicher and starring Mary Boland. It is based on a short story by Edith Barnard Delano that appeared in Harper's Magazine.

The film may have been rereleased in 1919 as a 5-reeler.

Plot
As described in a film magazine, Dr. Frederick Farnham (Bloomer) and his wife Marion (Boland) live a precarious existence in a cheap boarding house. Unhappy because she believes she is neglected, Marna runs off with another boarder who says he has "struck it rich". Dr. Farnham returns home to tell his wife that their days of poverty are over as he has obtained a position on the staff of a hospital, but finds that he and his four-year-old daughter Marna have been deserted. He tells her that her mother is dead and was a wonderful person. Marion goes down and down and becomes a shell of her former self and believes her daughter is dead. Years later, driven to extreme poverty, the mother determines to seek her husband out to obtain some relief. The doctor is now well-to-do and Marna (Cotton) has grown to womanhood. Marion goes to the doctor's home and does not find him there, but discovers her daughter in the flesh before her. Adroitly she finds out that Marna worships her "dead" mother, and Marion leaves, determined to sin no more. Marna marries a writer, Dallas Harvey (Gordon), and Marion becomes the family nursemaid after Marna has a child. When temptation comes to Marna the same way it did to Marion years earlier, Marion divulges her story and saves her daughter from sin. Dr. Farnham overhears the counsel and forgives his wife and begs her to return to him, but she refuses, declaring that she intends to devote her life to saving others just as she saved her daughter.

Cast
Mary Boland as Marion Farnham
Lucy Cotton as Marna Farnham
Raymond Bloomer as Dr. Frederick Farnham
Alfred Kappeler as Thomas Byrne 
Harris Gordon as Dallas Harvey
Vincent Coleman as Victor Middleton
Mrs. Stuart Robson (aka May Waldron) as Mrs. Dovey

References

External links

 

Contemporary advertisement(Wayback)

1918 films
American silent feature films
Lost American films
Films based on short fiction
Films directed by Frank Reicher
1918 drama films
American black-and-white films
Silent American drama films
1918 lost films
Lost drama films
1910s American films